The Universal Stylus Initiative (USI) is a non-profit alliance of companies promoting a proprietary technical standard for interoperable active pen styluses on touchscreen devices such as phones, tablets, and computers.

It defines a two-way communication protocol between the stylus and the computer and allows the stylus to remember user preferences for ink color and stroke. Multiple styluses can simultaneously draw on a single device. It support 9-axis inertial measurement.

Products started coming to market in 2019 including one stylus and several Chromebooks from different manufacturers. By 2019, there were over 30 members, including Google and 3M, but some major players like Apple and Microsoft had not joined. As of 2022 the promoters include Google, Intel, Lenovo, Samsung and Synaptics, while Dell, Sharp and Wacom are contributors.

Prior to 2020, access to the specification is only available to members, but the goal is to create an open, non-proprietary active stylus specification with a certification program for members. As of 2021, the range of supported devices was increasing.

See also 

  Computer mouse
  Human–computer interaction

References

External links 

 

Non-profit organizations based in Massachusetts